The 1922 Tennessee gubernatorial election was held on November 7, 1922. Democratic nominee Austin Peay defeated incumbent Republican Alfred A. Taylor with 57.89% of the vote.

Primary elections
Primary elections were held on August 3, 1922.

Democratic primary

Candidates
Austin Peay, former State Representative
Benton McMillin, former Governor
Harvey H. Hannah
L. E. Gwinn

Results

General election

Candidates
Austin Peay, Democratic
Alfred A. Taylor, Republican

Results

References

1922
Tennessee
Gubernatorial